Mashooq is the fourth album released by Punjabi Bhangra artist Kulwinder Dhillon. The music on this album was produced by Sukhpal Sukh. The album was released in 2003.

Track listing
 Kachiye Zubaan Diye 
 Khair Nahi
 Glassi
 Mashooq  
 Pyar
 Pardesi  
 Bootle          
 Juj Muhre                
 Pinki 
 Do Gallan

References

2003 albums
Kulwinder Dhillon albums